Catocala bella is a moth of the family Erebidae first described by Arthur Gardiner Butler in 1877. It is found in Russia (Siberia, Primorye, Khabarovsk, Southern Amur), Korea, China and Japan (Hokkaido, Honshu).

The wingspan is about 59 mm.

References

External links
"Catocala bella Butler, 1877 ノコメキシタバ,Cat.4184". Digital Moths of Japan. Retrieved February 17, 2019.

bella
Moths of Asia
Moths described in 1877